Reductio is open source software written using the Java Programming Language from an idea that originated in a research paper called QuickCheck: A Lightweight Tool for Random Testing of Haskell Programs. Reductio and QuickCheck utilise a testing technique called Automated Specification-based Testing.

The primary objective of Reductio is to make testing as rigorous as possible, while alleviating developer effort through automation of many common testing tasks. Reductio includes usage examples that demonstrate how this objective has been met using both traditional Java 1.5 and Java 7 BGGA syntax as well as Scala programming language examples.

Example 

The following example uses Java 7 BGGA syntax to execute 100 unit tests on java.util.LinkedList. It asserts that when a list (x) is appended to another list (y), then the size() of the resulting list (xy) is equivalent to the sum of the size() of the two original lists.

Property p = property(arbLinkedList(arbInteger), arbLinkedList(arbInteger), {  
  LinkedList<Integer> x, LinkedList<Integer> y =>  
    prop(append(x, y).size() == x.size() + y.size())        
});

Citations and footnotes

External links 
 Reductio website
 Reductio User Manual
 Reductio RequalsHashCode
 A Case for Automated Testing
 Tests As Documentation

Software testing tools
Free software programmed in Java (programming language)
Free software testing tools